Reggie Ford (11 June 1953 – 2 February 2021) was a Guyanese boxer. He competed in the men's light middleweight event at the 1972 Summer Olympics. As a light-welterweight, Ford won bronze medals at the 1971 Pan American Games and at the 1974 Central American and Caribbean Games.

References

External links
 

1953 births
2021 deaths
Light-welterweight boxers
Light-middleweight boxers
Guyanese male boxers
Olympic boxers of Guyana
Boxers at the 1972 Summer Olympics
Boxers at the 1971 Pan American Games
Pan American Games bronze medalists for Guyana
Pan American Games medalists in boxing
Boxers at the 1970 British Commonwealth Games
Commonwealth Games competitors for Guyana
Competitors at the 1974 Central American and Caribbean Games
Central American and Caribbean Games bronze medalists for Guyana
Sportspeople from Georgetown, Guyana
Afro-Guyanese people
Central American and Caribbean Games medalists in boxing
Medalists at the 1971 Pan American Games